The Minister for Oceans and Fisheries (known as the Minister of Fisheries until 2020) in New Zealand is a current cabinet member appointed by the Prime Minister to be responsible for New Zealand's aquaculture and fishing industries and to oversee the Ministry of Fisheries. Similar duties were performed previously by the Minister of Marine.

The present Minister is Stuart Nash, a member of the Labour Party.

List of ministers
The following ministers held the office of Minister of Fisheries.

Key

See also
 Aquaculture in New Zealand
 Fishing industry in New Zealand

Notes

References

Fisheries